Fillmore Condit (September 4, 1855 – January 6, 1939) was an American inventor, temperance activist and local politician serving New Jersey and later Long Beach, California.

Early life 
Fillmore Condit was born in Roseland, New Jersey on September 4, 1855, the son of Stephen J. and Catherine Tappan Condit. At the age of 24, in 1879 he invented and manufactured a refrigerator door fastener for use in meat markets. According to his own biography, he met his wife Ida Rafter as a customer in his store, and married her in 1881.

Later life 
The couple moved to Verona, New Jersey, where Fillmore soon participated in local politics, serving on the Essex County Board of Chosen Freeholders. The family moved to California in 1899 for one year, where Fillmore became interested in the oil industry. When they returned to New Jersey in 1901, he was placed in charge of the Eastern District of the Union Oil Co. of California.

Participation in social movements 
He also participated in the temperance and suffrage movements. He was briefly the executive chairman of the Anti-Saloon League of America. One of his most popular tracts was called "The Relation of Saloons to Insanity," published by the American Issue Publishing Company in 1910. He spoke at the National Suffrage Day open-air meeting in Montclair, and was one of the speakers during the tour of the "Torch of Victory," circulated under the auspices of the Women's Political Union. Condit was put up by the Anti-Saloon League as a candidate for governor of New Jersey in 1919, but for personal reasons decided to withdraw, obtaining concessions from the Republican Party they would support prohibition.

Condit's testimony for a grand jury investigating former Syracuse mayor and Tammany boss James Kennedy McGuire, was successful in obtaining McGuire's indictment on charges of soliciting a campaign contribution from a corporation.

City politics 
Condit and his family decided to return to California and settled in Long Beach, where he soon entered into city politics, serving as a councilman and mayor, and succeeded in founding a city hospital there. An article analyzing his hospital policies appeared in the journal California and Western Medicine. After Ida died in 1921, Fillmore married Helen Mackinnon on December 5, 1922. Condit died in Long Beach January 6, 1939.

See also
List of mayors of Long Beach, California

References

1855 births
1939 deaths
Mayors of Long Beach, California
People from Roseland, New Jersey
People from Verona, New Jersey
County commissioners in New Jersey